Cindy Roleder (born 21 August 1989) is a German track and field athlete, specializing in 100 metres hurdles. She won the silver medal at the 2015 World Championships in Athletics. Roleder claimed three medals at the European Athletics Championships, becoming the first German winner of the European 100 m hurdles title since reunification in 2016. She also won the 60 m hurdles title at the 2017 European Indoor Championships.

Roleder won nine German national titles outdoors and indoors.

Early life and early career
Cindy Roleder was born in Karl-Marx-Stadt, now Chemnitz. Originally a gymnast, she took up athletics at the age of 8 when her sports teacher Mr Grosser spotted her running speed and asked her to join his running club, where Roleder competed against children 1–2 years older than herself. She made her international debut at the 2007 European Junior Championships in Hengelo, Netherlands, where she finished fourth in the 100 metres hurdles. In 2011, Roleder won her first international medal in the event at the European Under-23 Championships held in Ostrava.

Career
Roleder competed at the 2012 Summer Olympics in London reaching the semifinals in her specialist event. She went one step better at the 2016 Olympic Games held in Rio de Janeiro and reached the final, finishing fifth. The biggest success of her career is the silver medal at the 2015 World Championships in Athletics in the 100 m hurdles with a personal best time of 12.59 seconds. She also won the 100 m hurdles at the 2016 European Championships and 60 m hurdles at the 2017 European Indoor Championships.

Achievements

International competitions

National titles
 German Athletics Championships
 100 m hurdles: 2011, 2015, 2016, 2019
 German Indoor Athletics Championships
 60 m hurdles: 2012, 2015, 2016, 2018, 2022

References

External links

 
 
 
 
 
 
 

1989 births
Living people
German female hurdlers
Olympic athletes of Germany
Athletes (track and field) at the 2012 Summer Olympics
Athletes (track and field) at the 2016 Summer Olympics
World Athletics Championships athletes for Germany
World Athletics Championships medalists
European Athletics Championships medalists
Sportspeople from Chemnitz